Lakegala mountain is situated in Sri Lanka about  away from the capital Colombo. This mountain is situated in Meemure village.

Lakegala is situated near the Border between Kandy and Matale Districts. There are several access points to Lakegala rock but the safest access road is from Meemure Village. "The Rock of Lanka" is the meaning of "Lakegala" in Sinhala language. The rock is about 1310m high and it is in the Knuckles mountain range aka "Dumbara Mitiyawatha".

References

Mountains of Sri Lanka
Populated places in Kandy District
Populated places in Matale District
Landforms of Central Province, Sri Lanka